State Route 644 (SR 644) in Fairfax County, Virginia, United States, is an  secondary state highway officially named Old Keene Mill Road west of Interstate 95 and Franconia Road to the east. While only a secondary state highway, it serves as a major thoroughfare through southern Fairfax County, acting as the main street through Springfield and Franconia, as well as serving Burke, West Springfield, and Rose Hill and connecting them towards Alexandria and Huntington near the Potomac River.

Route description

SR 644, signed as Old Keene Mill Road, begins at SR 286 (Fairfax County Parkway) in Burke as a two-lane road and heads northeast. The road then crosses SR 643 (Lee Chapel Road), at where it becomes a four-lane divided road, and then SR 640 (Sydenstricker Road), which spurs off southeast. SR644 then crosses Pohick Creek and enters West Springfield where it intersects with SR 638 (Rolling Road). The road continues east and eventually crosses Accotink Creek and enters Springfield. In Springfield, SR 644 widens to six lanes and has a short  controlled-access segment—completed during the Springfield Interchange project in 2001—which crosses I-95, where Old Keene Mill Road transitions to Franconia Road, and passes north of Springfield Town Center where it forms an interchange with SR 781 (Commerce Street), Loisdale Road, and Frontier Drive.

After passing through the interchanges, SR 644 continues east through Springfield then crosses over the Washington Metro Blue Line and RF&P Subdivision into Franconia, acting as the main thoroughfare through it. In Franconia, the road intersects Beulah Street and then South Van Dorn Street, which are both signed as SR 613. After crossing South Van Dorn Street, SR 644 enters Rose Hill and narrows to four lanes and then down to two at the center of the CDP. SR 644 continues east then terminates at SR 611 (Telegraph Road) near Huntington.

History

Franconia Road once served as a rolling road for transporting tobacco to the port in Alexandra.

In March 1999, the I-95/SR 644 interchange began reconstruction in 1999 with completion in November 2001, improving access to Springfield. This was part of the 1999–2007 Springfield Interchange reconstruction project which improved the I-95/I-395/I-495 corridors in the area. Alongside improving the interchange with I-95, another new interchange was constructed at Commerce Street (SR 781), Loisdale Road, and Frontier Drive, improving access to the Springfield Mall (now called Springfield Town Center).

Major intersections

References

Transportation in Fairfax County, Virginia
644 Fairfax